Cannabis in Georgia may refer to:

Cannabis in Georgia (country)
Cannabis in Georgia (U.S. state)